Weronika Wołodko (born 9 October 1998 in Elbląg) is a  Polish women's volleyball player, playing as a Setter.

Since the 2017–2018 season, she has been a player at Impel Wrocław.
In 2017, she was named to the Poland women's national volleyball team; She participated at the 2018 FIVB Volleyball Women's Nations League.

References

External links 

 FIVB profile

1998 births
Living people
Polish women's volleyball players
Place of birth missing (living people)